PVG is the IATA code of Shanghai Pudong International Airport.

PVG may also refer to:

Hampton Roads Executive Airport, FAA LID code PVG
Protection of Vulnerable Groups, see Independent Safeguarding Authority